Van Usher (born February 27, 1970) is an American former basketball player. He played college basketball for the Tennessee Tech Golden Eagles from 1989 to 1992. A  point guard, he holds school and Ohio Valley Conference records for single game, season, and career assist and steal totals. In 1990–91, he led NCAA Division I in steals with a 3.71 per game average. He had recorded 104 steals in 28 games en route to being named an OVC Second Team honoree. The following year as a senior, he led Division I in assists while averaging 8.76 per game. In 29 games, he accumulated 254 total assists as he earned an OVC First Team honor. He is one of two college basketball players to lead the country in both steals and assists (Basketball Hall of Fame inductee Jason Kidd is the other). After college, he signed with the Rochester Renegade of the Continental Basketball Association (CBA) but was placed on the injured reserve list before the start of his stint.

See also
List of NCAA Division I men's basketball season steals leaders
List of NCAA Division I men's basketball season assists leaders

References

1970 births
Living people
American men's basketball players
Basketball players from Georgia (U.S. state)
People from Lithonia, Georgia
Point guards
Sportspeople from DeKalb County, Georgia
Tennessee Tech Golden Eagles men's basketball players